Pier Francesco Silvani (1620–1685) was an Italian architect and designer, active during the Baroque period, in Florence and other sites in Tuscany.

He was the son of the Sienese architect Gherardo Silvani. After the confiscation of goods decree in 1536, introduced by Cosimo I, the Grand Duke of Tuscany, Silvani was forced to pursue a modest commercial career. He had three sons, Silvano Silvani, Salvatore Silvani and Gherardo Silvani. Pier Francesco worked on San Gaetano and in the refurbishment of San Marco in Florence, as well as in collaboration with Giovanni Battista Foggini, the aisle and high altar for the Church of Santo Stefano dei Cavalieri in Pisa. He also added Baroque touches to Bernardo Buontalenti's garden behind the Palazzo Corsini, Florence.

References

Filippo Baldinucci, Notizie de' Professori del Disegno, Da Cimabue in qua, Secolo V. dal 1610. al 1670. Distinto in Decennali ("Notice of the Professors of Design, from Cimabue to now, from 1610–1670"), p 528.

1620 births
1685 deaths
17th-century Italian architects
Architects from Florence
Italian Baroque architects